Percy Robert Miller Sr. (born April 29, 1970), known by his stage name Master P, is an American rapper, record producer, record executive, actor, and entrepreneur. He is the founder of the record label No Limit Records, which was relaunched as New No Limit Records through Universal Records and Koch Records, and again as Guttar Music Entertainment, and currently, No Limit Forever Records. He is also the founder and CEO of P. Miller Enterprises and Better Black Television, which was a short-lived online television network. Miller gained fame in the mid-1990s with the success of his hip hop group TRU as well as his fifth solo rap album Ice Cream Man (1996), which contained his first single "Mr. Ice Cream Man". Miller's  popularity grew in 1997 after the success of his Platinum single "Make 'Em Say Uhh!". In total, Miller has released 15 studio albums.

Early life 
Percy Robert Miller was born and raised in Central City in the Third Ward of Uptown New Orleans, Louisiana in the Calliope Projects. He is the oldest of five children. He has one sister, Germaine, and three brothers: Kevin, and platinum-selling rap artists Corey "C-Murder" and Vyshonne "Silkk the Shocker" Miller. He attended Booker T. Washington High School and Warren Easton High School. Having played on the basketball team, Miller attended the University of Houston on an athletic scholarship, but dropped out months into his freshman year and transferred to Merritt College in Oakland, California to major in business administration. After the death of his grandfather, Miller inherited $10,000 as part of a malpractice settlement. Miller opened a record store in Richmond, California called No Limit Records And Tapes, which later became the foundation for No Limit Records. On February 15, 1990, Master P released the cassette tape Mind Of A Psychopath. His brother Kevin Miller was killed that same year in New Orleans. This increased his motivation to become a successful entrepreneur to change his life and save his family.

Music career

1989–1995: Early works 
Master P released his debut studio album Get Away Clean on February 12, 1991. This was followed by his second album Mama's Bad Boy, which was released in April 1992. Both albums were released through In-A-Minute Records. In 1993, Master P released his first collaboration album with his group TRU titled Who's da Killer? Master P released his third studio album The Ghettos Tryin to Kill Me! on March 18, 1994; it was later re-released in 1997 as a limited edition under Priority. That same year Master P collaborated on the No Limit compilation albums West Coast Bad Boyz, Vol. 1: Anotha Level of the Game and West Coast Bad Boyz: High fo Xmas. On June 6, 1995, Master P released his fourth studio album 99 Ways to Die. Master P and TRU released their third album True in 1995, which was the group's first major release after two independent albums. The album reached number 25 on the Top R&B/Hip-Hop Albums and number 14 on the Top Heatseekers. The album was known for its first single and one of Master P's best known songs "I'm Bout' It, Bout It". He also worked on the compilation album, Down South Hustlers: Bouncin' and Swingin', during that year.

Master P said that when he used to open for Tupac Shakur in the early 1990s, the people responsible for introducing him would frequently call him "Mr. P the country singer".

1995–2000: Return to New Orleans and mainstream success 
In 1995, Master P moved from California back to New Orleans to relocate No Limit Records with a set of new artists and in-house producers Beats By the Pound. On April 16, 1996, Master P released his fifth album Ice Cream Man. It contained the hit single "Mr. Ice Cream Man". Later in 1996, Master P returned with TRU to work on Tru 2 da Game, which would not be released until February 18, 1997. At that time, TRU was reduced to a trio with just Master P alongside his brothers C-Murder and Silkk the Shocker. On September 2, 1997, Master P released his breakthrough album Ghetto D. The first week sales of the album were the highest of any of Master P's albums, selling over 760,000 copies, and it went on to go certified triple platinum. It contained the hit single "Make 'Em Say Uhh!", Master P's highest-charting single to date. The song earned him an MTV Video Music Award nomination the following year for "Best Rap Video", but lost to Will Smith's "Gettin' Jiggy Wit It". On June 2, 1998, Master P released his seventh and best-selling album to date MP Da Last Don. Master P released a film of the same name earlier that year. The album debuted at number 1 on the Billboard Top 200 charts selling over 400,000 copies in its first week, and went on to sell over four million copies. On October 26, 1999, Master P released his eighth studio album Only God Can Judge Me, which contained his single "Step To Dis". The album went certified gold, selling over 500,000 copies. In 1999, Master P and TRU released their fifth studio album Da Crime Family. On November 28, 2000, he released his ninth studio album Ghetto Postage which contained his hit singles "Bout Dat" and "Souljas". Also in 2000, Master P and his new group 504 Boyz released their debut album Goodfellas, which peaked at number 1 on the Top R&B/Hip-Hop Albums and contained their hit single "Wobble Wobble".

2001–2005: The New No Limit 
On December 18, 2001, Master P released his tenth studio album Game Face, the first Master P album released on The New No Limit, which had a partnership with Universal Records. In 2002, The 504 Boyz released their second album Ballers. Both albums charted high on the Hip-Hop charts, but shortly after, No Limit began to decline in popularity. Record sales as well as roster changes and lawsuits caused No Limit Records to file for bankruptcy on December 17, 2003.

Master P's eleventh album, titled Good Side, Bad Side, was released on March 23, 2004, through Koch Records, debuting at number 1 on the Billboard Independent Albums chart. Master P and TRU released their last album The Truth in 2005 followed by Master P's twelfth studio album Ghetto Bill Vol. 1.

2005–2007: Guttar Music 
In 2005, Master P and his son Romeo Miller formed the independent label Guttar Music. On November 29, 2005, Master P released his first independent album and thirteenth overall, Living Legend: Certified D-Boy, on Guttar Music. Master P and 504 Boyz released their last album titled Hurricane Katrina: We Gon Bounce Back that year, and it was dedicated to the victims of Hurricane Katrina.

In April 2006, Master P released a compilation album America's Most Luved Bad Guy. In 2007, Master P released a collaboration album with Romeo titled Hip Hop History that sold 32,000 copies worldwide.

2010–present: No Limit Forever and recent works 
On December 6, 2010, it was announced that Master P was going on a new tour with his brother Silkk The Shocker and his son Romeo titled No Limit Forever International. On February 8, 2011, Master P was featured on rapper Gucci Mane's track titled "Brinks". It was his first recorded song in over four years. In early 2012, Master P started to re brand his label. On August 10, 2012, he performed at Insane Clown Posse's 12th Annual "Gathering of the Juggalos" concert. On November 16, 2011, Master P released his first mixtape and first solo project in over 6 years, titled TMZ (Too Many Zeros). On August 2, 2012, it was announced that Master P was working on his thirteenth studio album Boss of All Bosses. On September 17, 2012, Master P released snippet of an upcoming single titled "Friends With Benefits" featuring rapper/singer Kirko Bangz.

On January 16, 2013, Master P released his second official mixtape titled Al Capone as a promotion for his Boss of All Bosses album. On February 12, 2013, Master P released his first collaboration mixtape titled New World Order with his new group, Louie V. Mob, which includes himself and rappers Alley Boy and Fat Trel. On August 6, 2013, Master P released his third official mixtape titled Famous Again as a promotion for his Boss of All Bosses album; it featured appearances from Rome, Silkk The Shocker, Dee-1, Young Louie, Play Beezy, Gangsta, Howie T, Clyde Carson, Game, Chief Keef, Fat Trel, Alley Boy, Problem, Wiz Khalifa, Tyga, and Chris Brown, as well as production from 1500 & Nothin, Young Bugatti, Stiv Schneider, The Composer, and JB. On December 6, 2013, Master P released his fifth album titled The Gift.

On January 23, 2014, it was announced that The Gift would be re-released on February 21, 2014, as a video album with a music video for every song, and that it would be titled The Platinum Gift. On February 6, 2014, it was announced that Master P was working on two new albums, Ice Cream Man 2, which is a sequel to Ice Cream Man, and Boss of All Bosses. On February 28, 2014, Miller released his fourth mixtape The Gift Vol. 1: Return of The Ice Cream Man.

On January 5, 2015, Master P released his second collaboration mixtape titled We All We Got with his new group Money Mafia, which includes himself, his son Maserati Rome, Ace B, Young Junne, Eastwood, Gangsta, Play Beezy, Calliope Popeye, Flight Boy, and No Limit Forever in-house producer Blaq N Mild. The mixtape would also include a surprise feature from rapper Lil Wayne on the track "Power". On February 9, 2015, Master P released his third collaboration mixtape titled #CP3 with his No Limit Forever artist and rapper Ace B. On April 20, 2015, Master P released his fourth collaboration mixtape titled Hustlin with his group Money Mafia. On June 4, 2015, it was announced that Master P's newest group Money Mafia would be releasing their debut album in 2015 titled Rarri Boys. On June 8, 2015, Master P along with Money Mafia would release their first single from Rarri Boys titled "Bonita". On July 16, 2015, Master P released his fifth collaboration mixtape titled The Luciano Family with his group Money Mafia. On October 7, 2015, Master P would reveal the cover art's and announced that there would be three sequel album installments to his critically acclaimed debut major label album Ice Cream Man titled Ice Cream Man 2: The Streets, Ice Cream Man 3: The Hustle, Ice Cream Man 4: The Lifestyle that will be released all on the same day. On October 13, 2015, Master P would reveal and announced the cover art, release date and track list to his upcoming new album titled Empire that will be released on November 28, 2015. On November 27, 2015, Master P would release his fourteenth album titled Empire, from the Hood to Hollywood; it would feature guest appearances from Krazy, Lil Wayne, Maserati Rome, Money Mafia, Ace B, BlaqNmilD, Fame-O and Luccianos, and would be released via his label No Limit Forever Records and Globy House Records.

On February 23, 2016, Master P would release a new single titled "Funeral"; it would feature his new group No Limit Boys members Ace B and Angelo Nano. On March 2, 2016, Master P would release a new single titled "Middle Finga". On March 18, 2016, during an interview Master P would announce he was working on a new album titled The Grind Don't Stop with his new group No Limit Boys & he would also announce his new tour titled the Pop-Up Tour. On March 28, 2016, it was announced that Master P's newest group No Limit Boys formerly Money Mafia would be releasing their debut album in 2016 titled No Limit Boys. On August 21, 2016, Master P released his sixth official mixtape titled The G Mixtape; it featured appearances from 2 Chainz, A$AP Ferg, E-40, The Game, Gucci Mane, Jeremih, Lil Wayne, Nipsey Hussle, No Limit Boys, Rick Ross, Usher, Travis Scott and Yo Gotti. On October 27, 2016, Master P released his seventh official mixtape titled Louisiana Hot Sauce; it featured appearances from fellow No Limit Forever artist Ace B, Angelo Nano, Cymphonique, Gangsta, J Slugg, Lambo, Moe Roy, Play Beezy, Romeo and Young Vee.

On January 6, 2017, Master P released his sixth collaboration mixtape titled We All We Got with his group No Limit Boys.

No Limit Chronicles 
On July 29, 2020, Master P released No Limit Chronicles, a five-part BET docuseries on his New Orleans-based hip-hop label. The series shares stories of Master P's career as a record executive and businessman, underscoring the unprecedented distribution deal with Priority Records that made No Limit Records a powerhouse record label in the 1990s. Awareness of the circumstances of Master P's incarcerated brother, C-Murder, resurged after the series aired, prompting Percy to rally for his brother's release. On August 17, 2020, Master P posted a video to his Instagram account of him and C-Murder's lawyer speaking to a group of protesters, inciting momentum to work in favor of his brother's liberation.

Business career 
Aside from being a rapper, Master P has enjoyed a successful career as an entrepreneur and investor. Miller opened a record store in Richmond, California called No Limit Records, which later became the foundation for his own record label of the same name.

Miller was one of the first rappers to notice and take advantage of the retail potential of the music industry. As an investor, Master P was one of the first rappers to build a business and financial empire by investing in a wide range of business and investment ventures from a variety of industries. He has since invested the millions of dollars he made from his No Limit record company into a travel agency, a Foot Locker retail outlet, real estate, stocks, film, music, and television production, toy making, clothing, telecommunications, a jewellery line, auto accessories, book and magazine publishing, car rims, fast food franchises, and gas stations. His sports management agency No Limit Communications, a joint venture with marketing guru Djuan Edgerton, was a success. His conglomerate company, No Limit Enterprises became a financial powerhouse. His real estate investment and property management company, the New Orleans-based PM Properties controls over 100 properties across the United States. According to Black Enterprise magazine, No Limit Enterprises grossed $110 million in revenue in 1998 alone. This level of success inspired other rappers to branch out into other business ventures and investments. Miller also has his own line of beverages called "Make 'Em Say Ughh!" energy drinks. Miller has also made a foray into mass media, where he founded Better Black Television, a cable television network in November 2010 based in New Orleans, making him the first rapper to establish a cable television network.

Rappers had historically focused more on the artistic and glamorous side of hip hop music while paying very little attention to the business, investment, and financial aspects. All that changed in 1996 when Master P signed a music distribution deal with Priority Records, one where No Limit Records would retain 100% ownership of their master recordings and keep 85% of their record's sales while giving Priority 15% in return for pressing and distribution which allows No Limit to profit from future sales such as catalogs and reissues. Master P went on to make hundreds of millions of dollars from this deal. Additionally, Master P invented many innovative marketing techniques. According to Wendy Day, CEO of the Rap Coalition, "Master P had a whole marketing movement. He was the first person to market the way a corporate entity like IBM would market to their clientele." Whereas the traditional model for marketing records was to spend millions of dollars on expensive videos and air play, Miller did not have such a luxury. As an independent artist, Miller had to find a way to sell, market and build platinum record selling demand on a limited recording budget. He was known for keeping upfront business expenses down and profit margins high. He began selling tapes out the trunk of his car in every city and town in America where there was potential demand for his music. He gave out free samples to people with expensive cars and had them playing his music throughout their neighborhoods. This street level guerrilla marketing technique set the foundation to build a larger fanbase for the future. After signing his deal with Priority, Miller began a high volume business model of cranking out as many records as possible, as frequently as possible. He branded all his albums, so that the No Limit brand became more important than the actual artist's name. Miller cross-promoted all his artists and albums inside the album covers. He also used pen and pixel graphics and Mafia-inspired themes to make his albums stand out using Photoshop. He offered 20 songs per album, whereas most albums offered 15 or less, as Miller learned that customers wanted more for their money. He turned his artists into Marvel comic book-like characters rather than just rappers. He made sure his artists were number one on SoundScan every time they released an album, to build the perception of popularity. He used inexpensive videos to promote his artists and he cross-promoted albums using films and vice versa and tied them altogether as a package. Brand image and identity became more important than just music quality. Miller's record labels have sold 75 million records as a result of his innovative marketing and branding strategies.

As founder and CEO of No Limit Entertainment, Miller at one time presided over a business empire that included his conglomerate No Limit Enterprises, No Limit Records, Bout It Inc., No Limit Clothing, No Limit Communications, No Limit Films, No Limit Sports Management, P. M. Properties, and Advantage Travel. Miller represented former NFL running back Ricky Williams when he was drafted by the New Orleans Saints; however, the deal was rated the worst contract for a player in NFL History by ESPN. Miller manages the music, film, and television career of his son, Romeo Miller, as well as pop star Forrest Lipton and Atlanta rapper Gucci Mane. Miller was the executive television producer for his teenage daughter Cymphonique's Nickelodeon Show, How To Rock, and the co-creator of Romeo!, the hit Nickelodeon television show that stars his son.

Income 
In 1998, Miller ranked 10th on Forbes magazine's list of America's 40 highest paid entertainers, with an estimated income of $56.5 million. In 2013, Miller's wealth is estimated to be $200 million, making him one of the wealthiest figures in the American hip hop scene.

Professional basketball career 
In 1998, Miller joined the Fort Wayne Fury of the CBA as a backup guard after a No Limit employee asked the Fury head coach to give his boss a tryout. According to the coach Miller was "coachable [and] an eager learner", but not NBA material.

Miller was on the Charlotte Hornets training camp roster for 10 days in January 1999. He was invited to participate at the request of Hornet Ricky Davis's father. He scored 7 points in intrasquad play and played eight minutes in two exhibition games before being released on February 1. Miller claimed he played well but was cut because his rap lyrics were too offensive.

That fall he was on the Toronto Raptors training camp roster. He scored eight points in one preseason game, but was dropped before the season began. He complained that the Raptors hadn't given him a fair chance.

In November, he signed with the San Diego Stingrays of the short-lived IBL, a "home for players without NBA skills and those who are developing them." His performance was disappointing and he played for less than a season.

In 2004, Miller played for the ABA's Las Vegas Rattlers and Long Beach Jam. He took part in the 2008 McDonald's NBA All-Star Celebrity Game and scored 17 points.

Other ventures

Film and television career 
Since 1997, Master P has been in numerous feature and straight-to-DVD films, as well as television shows. His filmography includes Uncle P, Uncle Willy's Family, Soccer Mom, Gone in 60 Seconds, Hollywood Homicide, Toxic, Foolish, and '. In 1999, he had a small run in World Championship Wrestling (WCW), where he led a professional wrestling stable called The No Limit Soldiers in a feud with Curt Hennig's The West Texas Rednecks. Master P also starred in Romeo! alongside his son Romeo Miller on the children's network Nickelodeon from 2003 to 2006. He was also a contestant on Dancing with the Stars, replacing Romeo who dropped out due to an injury. He partnered with Ashly DelGrosso and received a total score of 8 out of 30 for his pasodoble, the lowest score in the show's history. He was eliminated in Week 4.

In 1999, Miller starred alongside Eddie Griffin in the hit film Foolish.

As reported in March 2011, Miller planned to star in a new film with his protégé Gucci Mane, titled Get Money. The film, set for release through No Limit, would be based on Miller's book of the same name.

On June 10, 2015, it was announced that Master P and his family would be starring in their own reality show titled Master P's Family Empire. It is scheduled to be aired on Reelz sometime in November.

Writing 
On September 1, 2007, Miller released his first book, titled Guaranteed Success.

Pro wrestling 
In 1999, The No Limit Soldiers appeared on WCW Monday Nitro feuding with The Filthy Animals and The West Texas Rednecks.

On October 8, 2019, it was reported and confirmed that Master P purchased ownership in Brooklyn, New York-based independent wrestling promotion House of Glory.

Controversy 
The lyrics of Miller's "Brick to a Million" have been interpreted as intentionally disrespectful to rappers Kanye West and Lil Wayne. Miller denied that it was a diss track directed at them, and claimed it was in response to a radio station employee's remark that his career was over, and that it "ain't a diss. I never made a diss record."

Legacy 
Miller is known for his music and his business acumen, due to creating and branding his highly successful independent record label No Limit Records, as well as his other business ventures.

Miller is held in high esteem by other rappers as well. During an interview after meeting Miller, Atlanta rapper 2 Chainz stated, "This is my first time meeting [him]. I just want to let him know how he influenced the whole South in Hip-Hop." 2 Chainz went on, "We used to argue people like they ain't understand why we appreciated Master P and his music. It was more than that. I felt like it was his grind, his hustle. He actually put music out like every week. I even heard stories about some of the songs never even being mixed before. It was just about giving the fans what they needed. And he the reason why a lot of us are here, including myself."

Accolades and honors 
In 2001, Master P won the award for "Favorite Rap/Hip-Hop Artist" at the American Music Awards.

In 2005, Miller was ranked at number 36 by VH1 in their list of 50 Greatest Hip Hop Artists. On September 29, 2008, Miller's single "Make 'Em Say Uhh!" would be ranked at number 94 by VH1 in their list of 100 Greatest Hip-Hop Songs.

BET named Miller number 28 in 'The Most Influential Rappers of All Time'. BET also listed Miller as one of 'The 25 Influential Black Music Execs'.

In November 2011, Miller's son Romeo Miller performed at the 2010 Hip Hop Honors, along with his brother Valentino Miller, his cousins Lil' D and Black Don, and his uncle Silkk The Shocker, as well as Trina, Gucci Mane, and Mystikal to honor Master P and No Limit Records.

On December 11, 2012, DJ 5150 and DJ Hektik released a tribute mixtape to Master P titled Uptown Veteran.

On July 10, 2013, Miller was inducted into the Louisiana Music Hall of Fame, making him the first hip hop artist to be inducted.

On January 20, 2015, Montreal R&B/Hip Hop artist Xav released a song with Master P called "Bout It Bout It", from his upcoming Zeeky EP, paying homage to Master P's 1995 international hit. The music video, which also features Master P, premiered on Vibe.com the same day.

On May 23, 2021, Master P received his honorary doctorate from Lincoln University in Pennsylvania.

Philanthropy 
Miller has dedicated his time to communities through P. Miller Youth Centers and his P. Miller Food Foundation for the Homeless. On July 12, 2005, Willie W. Herenton Jr, the mayor of Memphis, Tennessee, presented Miller with the key to the city. On April 27, 2010, Miller and his son Romeo were awarded the Certificate of Special Recognition from California Congresswoman Maxine Waters.

Personal life 
Miller is Catholic. In 1999, he donated $500,000 to the Catholic elementary school he attended and to two nearby churches. After 21 years of marriage Miller and his wife, Sonya C. Miller, separated in 2010 but Sonya did not file for a divorce until 2013. The former couple have 7 children together and Miller had 1 child out of the marriage and raised his brothers child, Veno, after he had been killed in a robbery in 1990. In 2014, Sonya sued Miller, asking for almost 40% of their assets. Miller has claimed that the two had settled the matter privately in 2016 but it was never submitted to court. In December 2021, he asked the judge to declare him legally single. In May 2022, it was reported that the rapper was legally declared single.

In 2007, he swore off of profanity and endorsed Barack Obama for President of the United States of America, contributing frequently to his campaign.

On May 29, 2022, Miller announced that his daughter Tytyana Miller had died at 25 years old.

Discography 

Studio albums
 Get Away Clean (1991)
 Mama's Bad Boy (1992)
 The Ghettos Tryin to Kill Me! (1994)
 99 Ways to Die (1995)
 Ice Cream Man (1996)
 Ghetto D (1997)
 MP da Last Don (1998)
 Only God Can Judge Me (1999)
 Ghetto Postage (2000)
 Game Face (2001)
 Good Side, Bad Side (2004)
 Ghetto Bill (2005)
 The Gift (2013)
 Empire, from the Hood to Hollywood (2015)
 Louisiana Hot Sauce (2016)

Filmography

Film

Television

Documentaries

Biographical portrayals in film

See also 
 Universal Music Group
 GoDigital Media Group

References

External links 
Tank Soldiers

1969 births
Living people
20th-century American businesspeople
20th-century American male actors
20th-century American male musicians
20th-century American male writers
20th-century American non-fiction writers
20th-century American rappers
21st-century American businesspeople
21st-century American male actors
21st-century American male musicians
21st-century American male writers
21st-century American non-fiction writers
21st-century American rappers
African-American businesspeople
African-American Catholics
African-American film producers
African-American investors
African-American male actors
African-American male rappers
African-American non-fiction writers
African-American record producers
African-American screenwriters
African-American songwriters
African-American television producers
American book publishers (people)
American business writers
American chief executives in the media industry
American chief executives of food industry companies
American drink industry businesspeople
American fashion businesspeople
American film producers
American finance and investment writers
American hip hop record producers
American investors
American magazine publishers (people)
American male film actors
American male non-fiction writers
American male rappers
American male screenwriters
American male songwriters
American male television actors
American male voice actors
American marketing businesspeople
American mass media company founders
American mass media owners
American motivational speakers
American motivational writers
American music industry executives
American music managers
American music publishers (people)
American music video directors
American nonprofit chief executives
American philanthropists
American real estate businesspeople
American reality television producers
American retail chief executives
American self-help writers
American sex industry businesspeople
American sports agents
American stock traders
American talent agents
American telecommunications industry businesspeople
American television executives
Businesspeople from New Orleans
Businesspeople from the San Francisco Bay Area
Film producers from California
Film producers from Louisiana
Fort Wayne Fury players
Gangsta rappers
Long Beach Jam players
Male actors from California
Male actors from New Orleans
Male actors from the San Francisco Bay Area
Merritt College alumni
MNRK Music Group artists
Musicians from Richmond, California
Nightclub owners
No Limit Records artists
Priority Records artists
Rappers from California
Rappers from New Orleans
Record producers from California
Record producers from Louisiana
San Diego Stingrays players
Screenwriters from California
Screenwriters from Louisiana
Songwriters from California
Songwriters from Louisiana
Southern hip hop musicians
Television producers from California
University of Houston alumni
Warren Easton High School alumni
Writers from New Orleans
Writers from the San Francisco Bay Area